The 1951 Norwegian Football Cup was the 46th season of the Norwegian annual knockout football tournament. The tournament was open for all members of NFF, except those from Northern Norway. The final was played at Ullevaal Stadion in Oslo on 21 October 1951, and was contested by five-time former winners Sarpsborg and Asker, who made their first appearance in the cup final. Sarpsborg won the final 3-2, after extra time, and secured their sixth title. Fredrikstad were the defending champions, but were eliminated by Vålerengen in the quarter-final.

First round

|-
|colspan="3" style="background-color:#97DEFF"|Replay

|}

Second round

|-
|colspan="3" style="background-color:#97DEFF"|Replay

|}

Third round

|colspan="3" style="background-color:#97DEFF"|12 August 1951

|-
|colspan="3" style="background-color:#97DEFF"|Replay: 26 August 1951

|}

Fourth round

|colspan="3" style="background-color:#97DEFF"|26 August 1951

|-
|colspan="3" style="background-color:#97DEFF"|'16 September 1951

|-
|colspan="3" style="background-color:#97DEFF"|Replay: 16 September 1951

|}

Quarter-finals

|colspan="3" style="background-color:#97DEFF"|23 September 1951

|}

Semi-finals

|colspan="3" style="background-color:#97DEFF"|7 October 1951

|}

Final

See also
1950–51 Norwegian Main League
1951 in Norwegian football

References

Norwegian Football Cup seasons
Norway
Cup